Kalu or Kaloo may refer to:

Places
Kalu, Afghanistan
Kalu, Rajasthan, a village in Lunkaransar Tehsil, Bikaner district, India
Kalu, Bostanabad, a village in Bostanabad County, East Azerbaijan Province, Iran
Kalu, Varzaqan, a village in Varzaqan County, East Azerbaijan Province, Iran
Kalu, alternate name of Gol Chul, a village in Varzaqan County, East Azerbaijan Province, Iran
Kalu, Gorgan, a village in Gorgan County, Golestan Province, Iran
Kalu, Ramian, a village in Ramian County, Golestan Province, Iran
Kalu, Hormozgan, a village in Hormozgan Province, Iran
Kalu, Dargaz, a village in Dargaz County, Razavi Khorasan Province, Iran
Kalu, Kalat, a village in Kalat County, Razavi Khorasan Province, Iran
Kalu river, a river in Sri Lanka
Kalu (woreda), a district in Ethiopia
Kalu, Takht-e Suleyman Massif, a summit in Takht-e Suleyman Massif

Other uses
Kalu (name)
KALU, an American radio station

See also
Kalow (disambiguation)
Kolu (disambiguation)